The Yale Entrepreneurial Society (YES) is a student-run nonprofit 501(c)(3) organization dedicated to encouraging entrepreneurship and business development in the New Haven, Connecticut area.  YES was founded in 1999 by Yale undergraduates Sean Glass and Miles Lasater.  Its social entrepreneurship program—focused on not-for-profit and socially responsible organizations—was founded the same year, with efforts led by fellow student David Pozen.  Today, YES members include Yale undergraduate, graduate, professional students, and faculty, as well as several hundred Yale alumni around the world.

The Yale Entrepreneurial Society's mission is the following:
 Create and foster a community of entrepreneurs at Yale; promote the belief that entrepreneurial principles can be applied to any endeavor
 Offer resources helpful to students at any level of engagement with entrepreneurship
 Offer educational and networking opportunities to foster new venture creation; teach the lean startup model
 Organize campus and regional events to encourage innovation at Yale
 Publish information concerning new, events and opportunities through the magazine

Yale Venture Challenge 
The Yale Venture Challenge was previously known as Y50K. It is held annually in April, and awards up to $25,000 in grants to student entrepreneurs. The competition involves a 10-minute pitch and a 5-minute Q&A in front of a panel of judges.

The Y50K was YES's annual business plan competition. The competition ran annually after its inception in 2000.  Each year, a total of $50,000 in grants were given away to new businesses in the Yale community.  In 2004, a biotechnology category was added to the usual two categories of competition, social entrepreneurship and for-profit.  The Y50K also had a strategic alliance with StudentBusinesses.com that allows the competition to be conducted completely online. In the early 2010s Y50K was changed to YVC, open only to students at Yale University.

Elevator Pitch Competition
The Elevator Pitch Competition promotes idea generation and presentation from any student in the Yale community. Pitches are no longer than three minutes, so this competition is accessible to more students since a fully hashed-out business plan is not required. Barry Nalebuff has traditionally been the judge for this competition. Past winners include Ovote, Prepd, and Junzi Kitchen.

The Yale Entrepreneurial Magazine
The Yale Entrepreneurial Magazine, published and supported by the Yale Entrepreneurial Society, is Yale's only magazine of entrepreneurship.  First published in 2001, the YE went out of publication in 2003 until being relaunched in the fall of 2013 by Nicole Clark and Aaron Lewis.

Speakers 
YES brings notable entrepreneurs and successful businessmen and women to speak at Yale's campus. Past speakers include: 
 Warren Buffett, business magnate
 Evan Spiegel, founder of Snapchat
 Diane Von Fürstenberg, designer and style icon
 Jennifer Fleiss, founder of Rent the Runway
 Elmar Mock, co-inventor of Swatch
 Brad Hargreaves, co-founder of General Assembly
 Amanda Moskowitz, co-founder of Nine Naturals
 Wendy Kopp, founder of Teach for America

Regional events
YES hosts a variety of events throughout the year to highlight entrepreneurship at Yale and in the greater New Haven and Connecticut regions.  While venues vary from year to year, common events usually include YES New York, YES Boston, and the Innovation Summit (hosted in New Haven). Students annually visit tech companies and startups in New England including Google, Etsy, Dropbox, Spotify, Rent the Runway, and Venture for America. The organization has also held events in Silicon Valley.

References

External links
Official website

1999 establishments in Connecticut
Entrepreneurship organizations
Yale University